Hors catégorie (HC) is a French term used in stage bicycle races to designate a climb that is "beyond categorization". The term was originally used for those mountain roads where cars were not expected to be able to pass.

The HC climb is the most difficult type of climb in a race. It is more demanding than a Category 1 climb which in turn is more demanding than a Category 2 climb and so on. The easiest category is Category 4.

These five categories are defined by their steepness and length. In addition, their position on the route can play a role. For instance, a climb that would normally be a Category 1 climb can become a HC climb if it is the final climb of a stage.

The average HC climb in the Tour de France from 2012 to 2016 is 16.1 kilometers long and has a grade of 7.4%. There are around 7 HC climbs per Tour.

History
When the mountains classification in the Tour de France originated in the 1933 Tour de France, there was only one type of mountain. Points were given to the first cyclists to cross the mountains, starting with 10 points for the first cyclist, going down to 1 point for the tenth cyclist. After the Second World War, in the 1947 Tour de France, the mountains were divided into two categories, the first and the second category. The first category mountains gave 10 points to the first cyclist, similar to before 1939, and the second category mountains gave only 5 points to the first cyclist.

The division in categories was successful, and two years later, in 1949, the third category was added. These were even smaller mountains, which gave 3 points to the cyclist reaching the peak first.

In 1962, the fourth category was added. The points system was also revised: the first category now gave 15 points for the first cyclist, the second category 10 points, the third category 5 points and the fourth category 3 points.
Although the fourth category disappeared in 1963, it came back again in 1964. The system with four categories kept in place until 1978, although the points distribution changed over the years.

In 1979, four categories was considered not enough, and another category was added. Instead of adding a fifth category, the Tour organisation decided to add a hors catégorie.

Tour de France
The following climbs used in the Tour de France have been ranked "Hors catégorie" at least once.

See also
 List of highest paved roads in Europe
 List of mountain passes

Notes

Road bicycle racing terminology
Tour de France

de:Gepunktetes Trikot#Anstiege "Hors Categorie"